Christopher Andrew McClarney (born November 30, 1979) is an American Christian musician. He released, Love Never Fails, in 2008, and this was an independently made album. His first release with Kingsway Music was an EP released in 2010, Introducing Chris McClarney. The first studio album, Defender, was released later in 2010 by Kingsway Music. The next release, a live album, Everything and Nothing Less, released on June 9, 2015 by Jesus Culture Music alongside Sparrow Records.

Early life
McClarney was born on November 30, 1979, to a youth minister father, and this constantly made relocating part of his life story.

Music career
His music career commenced in 2006, but his first album, Love Never Fails, was released independently on December 1, 2008. This album was reviewed by Cross Rhythms. His song co-written with Anthony Warren Skinner, "Love Never Fails", has been recorded by the Newsboys, on their album God's Not Dead. He released an EP, Introducing Chris McClarney, on January 26, 2010 by Kingsway Music. The EP was reviewed by AllMusic, Christian Music Review, Christianity Today, Cross Rhythms, Jesus Freak Hideout, and Louder Than the Music. His first studio album, Defender, was released on August 10, 2010 by Kingsway Music. The album was reviewed by AllMusic, Christian Music Review, Christian Music Zine, Cross Rhythms, Jesus Freak Hideout, and Louder Than the Music.

Personal life
He is married to Jasmine, and together they reside in Nashville, Tennessee, with their three children; Aliya, Ceili and Charlotte (Charlie).

Discography

Studio albums 
 Love Never Fails (December 1, 2008, Independent)
 Defender (August 10, 2010, Kingsway)

Live albums

Extended plays

Singles

References

External links
 
 AllMusic artist profile
 Cross Rhythms artist profile
 Jesus Freak Hideout artist profile
 New Release Tuesday artist profile
 Louder Than the Music artist profile

1979 births
Living people
American performers of Christian music
Musicians from Nashville, Tennessee
Songwriters from Tennessee